Dea Chester King (December 4, 1901 – December 2, 1981) was an American politician in the state of Washington. He served in the Washington House of Representatives from 1945 to 1967.

References

1901 births
1981 deaths
Democratic Party members of the Washington House of Representatives